List of Orthodox Archbishops of Margveti of the Georgian Orthodox and Apostolic Church:

 Konstantine (Metropolitan of Margveti) (until 2002)
 Vakhtang (first archbishop of Margveti, full name Badri Akhvlediani) (since 2002)

References 

Georgian Orthodox Church
Margveti